Admiral Wilkinson may refer to:

Eugene Parks Wilkinson (1918–2013), U.S. Navy vice admiral
Edward A. Wilkinson (1933–2020), U.S. Navy rear admiral
Peter Wilkinson (Royal Navy officer) (born 1956), British Royal Navy vice admiral
Theodore Stark Wilkinson (1888–1946), U.S. Navy vice admiral